Kritsky is a genus of digeneans in the family Aporocotylidae or blood flukes. The name of the genus honours the American parasitologist Delane C. Kritsky.

The genus includes the single species Kritsky platyrhynchi (Guidelli, Isaac & Pavanelli, 2002) Orelis-Ribeiro & Bullard, 2016, which is a parasite of the body cavity of the porthole shovelnose catfish, Hemisorubim platyrhynchos  (Pimelodidae) in Peru.

References

Diplostomida